Đeletovci railway station is a railway station on Novska–Tovarnik railway. Located in Đeletovci, Nijemci. Railroad continued to Jankovci in one and the other direction to Tovarnik. Đeletovci railway station consists of five railway tracks.

See also 
 Croatian Railways
 Zagreb–Belgrade railway

References 

Railway stations in Croatia